Bandar Al Hajjar (born 1953) is a Saudi Arabian economist and former Hajj minister. He was removed from post over 2015 Hajj stampede.

Early life and education
Al Hajjar was born in Madinah in 1953. He obtained a bachelor of arts degree in economics and politics from King Saud University in 1976. He received a master's degree in economics from Indiana University in 1980. Then he obtained a PhD in economics from Loughborough University in the United Kingdom in 1989. His PhD thesis was entitled "Funding the small projects in the Kingdom of Saudi Arabia".

Career
Bandar Al Hajjar began his career as the vice president of the Islamic Economy Center. He later became the vice dean of administration and economics faculty at King Saud University. His tenure lasted from 1982 to 1984. He was also a lecturer at King Abdulaziz University from 1989 to 2005. He served as a member of the Shoura Council beginning in 1997. Later he became the chair of the council's committee on foreign affairs. Then he was appointed deputy chairman of the National Society for Human Rights in 2004. He was the president of the National Society for Human Rights from 2005 to October 2008. He became vice president of the Shoura Council on 25 October 2008.

From 1996 to 2006 Bandar Al Hajjar was chief editor of Money and Markets Magazine a specialized business magazine addressing the concerns of the Arab and Islamic worlds.

He was appointed minister of Hajj on 13 December 2011, replacing Fuad bin Abdulsalam Farsi in the post. Farsi had been in office since 1999.

Hajjar was announced as the next president of Islamic Development Bank and the 41st annual session of the board of governors of IDB, held in Jakarta between 14–19 May 2016, ratified the Kingdom's nomination of Hajjar as the new president of the bank. He took the helm on 1 October 2016.

References

External links

1953 births
Alumni of Loughborough University
Government ministers of Saudi Arabia
Indiana University alumni
Living people
Academic staff of King Abdulaziz University
King Saud University alumni
Academic staff of King Saud University
Saudi Arabian economists
Saudi Arabian journalists